This islands of the Arctic Ocean can be classified by the country that controls the territory.

Canada
Arctic Archipelago
Queen Elizabeth Islands
Axel Heiberg Island
Ellesmere Island
Devon Island
Melville Island
Baffin Island
Banks Island
Victoria Island
Hans Island (shared with Denmark)
Herschel Island (in the Beaufort Sea, part of the Yukon)

Denmark
Aasiaat Archipelago
Clavering Island
Geographical Society Island
Kaffeklubben Island
Milne Land
Naresland
Qeqertarsuaq (Disko Island)
Shannon Island
Traill Island
Ymer Island
Hans Island (shared with Canada)

Iceland
 Bjarnarey
 Drangey
 Eldey
 Engey
 Flatey, Breiðafjörður
 Flatey, Skjálfandi
 Grímsey
 Heimaey
 Hrísey
 Hvalbakur
 Kolbeinsey
 Málmey
 Papey
 Surtsey
 Viðey
 Vigur
 Æðey

Norway
Bear Island
Jan Mayen
Svalbard Archipelago:
Barentsøya
Alekseevøya
Kükenthaløya
Edgeøya
Halvmåneøya
Ryke Yseøyane
Thousand Islands
Zeiløyane
Hopen
Kong Karls Land
Abel Island
Kongsøya
Svenskøya
Kvitøya (White Island)
Nordaustlandet
Chermsideøya
Foynøya
Karl XII-øya
Lågøya
Nordre Castrénøya and Søre Castrénøya
Repøyane
Sabine Islands
Scoresbyøya
Storøya
Prins Karls Forland
Spitsbergen
Amsterdam Island
Danes Island
Fuglesangen
Moffen
Nymark
Sørkappøya
Wilhelm Island
Sjuøyane
Martensøya
Nelsonøya
Parryøya
Phippsøya
Rossøya
Tavleøya
Vesle Tavleøya
Waldenøya
Hinnoya

Russia
Russian Arctic islands
Dikson Island
Franz Josef Land
Bell Island
Graham Bell Island
Hooker Island
Jackson Island
Northbrook Island
Rudolf Island
Wilczek Island
Zemlya Aleksandry
Zemlya Georga
Great Diomede Island
New Siberian Islands
Anzhu Islands
Belkovsky Island
Kotelny/Faddeyevsky Island (including the island of 'Bunge Land')
New Siberia
Lyakhovsky Islands
Great Lyakhovsky Island
Little Lyakhovsky Island
Semyonovsky Island
Stolbovoy Island
Novaya Zemlya
Mezhdusharskiy Island
Severny Island
Vaygach Island
Yuzhny Island
Severnaya Zemlya
October Revolution Island
Bolshevik Island
Komsomolets Island
Pioneer Island
Schmidt Island
De Long Islands
Bennett Island
Henrietta Island
Jeannette Island
Vilkitsky Island
Zhokhov Island
Minor Islands in Severnaya Zemlya
Bolshoy Island
Maly Taymyr Island
Sedov Archipelago
Srednij, Golomyannyj, Domashnij, Figurnyj, Vostochnyj, Smaojlovich
Vostothny Island
Solovetsky Islands
Anzersky
Bolshaya Muksalma
Malaya Muksalma
Solovetsky
Victoria Island (administered as part of Franz Josef Land, but physically separate)
Ushakov Island (Russian Arctic) halfway between Franz Josef Land and Severnaya Zemlya
Wrangel Island
Herald Island

Five new islands were discovered by Russia in October 2019.

United States
 Barter Island
 Arey Island

See also 

List of islands
List of islands in the Atlantic Ocean
List of islands in the Pacific Ocean
List of islands in the Indian Ocean
List of islands of Antarctica and the Southern Ocean
Extreme points of the Arctic

References

Arctic Ocean